The Manufaktura is an arts centre, shopping mall, and leisure complex in Łódź, Poland. A major tourist asset of the city, it includes the largest public square in Łódź, which acts as a venue for cultural and sports events.

The Manufaktura opened on 17 May 2006, after 5 years of planning and the subsequent 4 years of construction. The work involved the renovation of an old textile factory building. The Manufaktura is located in the central part of the city, in the former industrial complex founded by Izrael Poznański, which is known also as the filming location of the novel by Władysław Reymont titled The Promised Land about the industrialization of the city of Łódź.

Organization

The revival was aimed at preserving the place's historical atmosphere, which is why the Manufaktura is now dominated by genuine industrial architecture, with unplastered red brick buildings. The complex's trademark is the old, five-storey spinning mill in Ogrodowa Street, built between 1877 and 1878 (which explains the name of the complex). In 2009, a four-star Andel's hotel opened there. All the other buildings of the complex keep a similar style, but are of a lesser size. The exception to this is the main shopping hall, which is a brand-new structure made of glass and steel. It is lower than the surrounding brick buildings, and therefore, it cannot be seen from the outside.

One of the entrances to the Manufaktura complex leads through the ancient, triumphal arch-like gate of the old spinning mill. The whole complex, with its concept of mixing the old and the new, was designed by the British firm Virgile & Stone from London, in collaboration with the French architecture firm Sud Architectes from Lyon. The original industrial buildings were designed by the famous Łódź architect Hilary Majewski in 1872.

Services
The Manufaktura hosts over 300 stores, malls, restaurants, pastry shops, cafes, pubs and other services. The service sector extends over 12,000 m2. The entire complex has a surface of 270,000 m2, making it Poland's second largest only to the Old Market Square in Kraków. Its large square features Europe's longest fountain at 300 meters. Clients can go along the complex with two trambuses.

Besides the commercial area, the Manufaktura includes a restaurant complex, car parks, a cultural centre (including the MS2 branch of The Museum of Art in Łódź, a science museum, a Factory Museum, and the Museum of the City of Łódź – the last of which is situated in the neighbouring Izrael Poznański Palace), and an entertainment centre (featuring a multiplex cinema, a bowling alley, a climbing wall, a fitness club, and a skatepark).

See also
History of Łódź

References

  The Manufaktura's website in English. Featuring Timeline of history, 1851–2006 at En.Manufaktura.com

Buildings and structures in Łódź
Brick buildings and structures
Shopping malls in Poland
Shopping malls established in 2006
2006 establishments in Poland
Mixed-use developments in Poland
Adaptive reuse of industrial structures in Poland
Retail parks in Europe